Incognito was a British game show that aired on BBC1 from 25 October 1995 to 10 January 1997. It was hosted by Peter Smith.

Gameplay
In each edition 3 contestants competed against each other for the chance to move on to the next round of the series with the overall winner at the end of the series winning a major holiday.

The contestants were shown a 'wheel of letters' and the answers to the questions or the crossword style clues were right in front of them on the wheel, there were 3 different wheels
 Quiz wheel – Where the contestants answered general knowledge questions.
 Puzzle Wheel – The contestants were asked crossword style clues.
 Word Wheel – This was a solo round where each contestant had 30 seconds to spot as many words on the wheel then spell them.

The final round was a series of quiz wheels & puzzle wheels but this time the contestant lost 10 points for giving a wrong answer, this round was played until a time up siren sounded meaning it was the end of the game.

The contestant with the most points was the winner and moved to the next round of the programme while the losing contestants went home with a dictionary and an Incognito polo shirt.

Transmissions

References

External links

1990s British game shows
1995 British television series debuts
1997 British television series endings
BBC television game shows
English-language television shows